The Kuwaiti modern art movement emerged in the 1930s, Kuwait has the oldest modern arts movement in the Arabian Peninsula. Kuwait is home to more than 20 art galleries. In recent years, Kuwait's contemporary art scene has boomed. Kuwait has the second most lively gallery scene in the GCC (after Dubai).

The Amiri Diwan recently inaugurated the new Kuwait National Cultural District (KNCD), which comprises Sheikh Abdullah Al Salem Cultural Centre, Sheikh Jaber Al Ahmad Cultural Centre, Al Shaheed Park, and Al Salam Palace. With a capital cost of more than US$1 billion, the project is one of the largest cultural investments in the world. In November 2016, the Sheikh Jaber Al Ahmad Cultural Centre opened. It is the largest cultural centre in the Middle East. The Kuwait National Cultural District is a member of the Global Cultural Districts Network.

History
Kuwait has the oldest modern arts movement in the Arabian Peninsula. Beginning in 1936, Kuwait was the first Gulf country to grant scholarships in the arts. The Kuwaiti artist Mojeb al-Dousari was the earliest recognized visual artist in the Persian Gulf region. He is regarded as the founder of portrait art in the region. In 1943, al-Dousari launched Kuwait's first art gallery.

The Sultan Gallery was the first professional Arab art gallery in the Persian Gulf region. Khalifa Al-Qattan was the first Kuwaiti artist to hold a solo artist exhibition in Kuwait. He founded a new art theory in the early 1960s known as "circulism". Other notable Kuwaiti artists include Sami Mohammad, Thuraya Al-Baqsami and Suzan Bushnaq.

Art galleries
List of art galleries in Kuwait:
 Dar Al Funoon
 Contemporary Art Platform (CAP)
 Boushahri Gallery
 Sultan Gallery
 Free Art Atelier
 Den Gallery
 The Hub
 Al Mashreq Gallery
 Ghadir Gallery
 Al Othman Gallery 
 Dahiya Abdullah Al-Salim Art Gallery
 AM Art & Design Gallery
 Al Adwani Art Gallery
 Visual Therapy Gallery
 The Print Room
 Art Space
 Museum of Modern Art
 Al-Makan
 Masaha 13
 Center of the Arts
 Sadu House 
 Dar al-Athar al-Islamiyyah at Yarmouk Cultural Centre
 Dar El Cid
 Manifesto 13
 Promenade Culture Center
 Wejha
 Fann Way Gallery
 Fine Arts Centre, Sheikh Abdullah Al Salem Cultural Centre

References

External links
Art Kuwait

Kuwaiti culture